Neonitocris rubricollis is a species of beetle in the family Cerambycidae. It was described by Pierre Téocchi and Jérôme Sudre in 2003.

References

rubricollis
Beetles described in 2003